Robert Small is an American television, film and event producer who co-created MTV Unplugged with Jim Burns in 1989. He is the president and executive producer of RSE, Robert Small Entertainment, a media production company based in New York City. In 2013 Small began developing his new company, Small Industries, to focus on digital content creation and special projects exploring virtual reality, augmented reality and holographic entertainment.

Television production
In 1989, Small and then partner Jim Burns co-created the music series MTV Unplugged, which they then executive produced.

He was an executive producer for the Pulp Comics series for Comedy Central, which integrated short films and standup material in the same half hour format. It ran from 1996 to 2000. Pulp Comics featured artists such as Louis C.K., Margaret Cho and Dave Attell. RSE also produced specials for HBO with Denis Leary and others in addition to A&E television worldwide.

Small is also credited as an executive producer on projects including MTV's The Spoken Word, AETN's Bio series, TV Land's Top Ten, and VH1's Hard Rock Live.

In the summer of 2009, Small teamed up with Worldwide Biggies as an executive producer for the First Annual Worldwide Fido Awards for Nick at Nite.

RSE continues its work in comedy, music, biographies and documentary production.

Directing
In 2009, Small wrote and directed his first independent documentary feature, Something Out of Nothing, which discusses the world of urban theater. In 2010 it was featured at HBO's Urban World Film Festival, DeadCENTER Film Festival, Black Soil Film Festival, ITVFest (Independent Television Festival), Texas Black Film Festival and the San Francisco Black Film Festival.

He has directed several feature-length documentaries and television specials, including Back from Hell: A Tribute to Sam Kinison (2010) and I Ain't Scared of You: A Tribute to Bernie Mac (2012).

Other work
In 2013 Small became the producer of the Woodstock Comedy Festival, an annual three-day charity event featuring films, stand-up performances, panels and discussion about comedy past and present.

Small is currently the director of The Macaulay Honors College New Media Lab in New York City, part of City University of New York. The Macaulay Honors College is CUNY's honors program. It gives high-performing students from public colleges the opportunities often associated with the top tier private universities.

Small has been part of a major fundraising effort to renovate the lab on West 67th Street in NYC. The New Media and Digital Content Lab will feature state-of-the-art audio, video and editing facilities in addition to a new green screen stage and streaming capabilities. The lab will offer a start-up incubator, data science program and digital content production all designed to ready students for the high level positions in the science of media.

Awards and honors
For his work on MTV Unplugged, Small won the Peabody Award, and was nominated for Emmy Awards in 1994, 1995 and 1996.

He has also won 12 Telly Awards, ASCAP's Deems Taylor Award and 11 International Film Television Awards for various projects. He received the MTV Video Music Award.

References

External links

American film producers
Place of birth missing (living people)
American television producers
Living people
Year of birth missing (living people)